"Needle in the Hay" is a song by American singer-songwriter Elliott Smith. It was released on January 1, 1995, by record label Kill Rock Stars as the sole single from his second studio album, Elliott Smith.

Recording 

Trumpet and harmonica were recorded for the song but were omitted from the final mix. A mix featuring the extra instrumentation was released in March 2012.

Release 

"Needle in the Hay" was released as a 7" vinyl single on January 1, 1995, by record label Kill Rock Stars. It is the lead track on the album Elliott Smith, released in May that year.

Live performances 

During later shows with a full band, the song was given more of a "rock" arrangement and would feature drums and bass, with Smith also singing the vocals an octave higher.

Legacy 

Pitchfork Media placed the song at number 27 in their list of the two-hundred best songs of the 1990s.

"Needle in the Hay" appeared in Wes Anderson's 2001 film The Royal Tenenbaums, in a scene featuring a suicide attempt. Smith was reportedly unhappy about the song being used this way. The song appeared on the film's soundtrack.

In 2017, Australian music and culture publication, Happy Mag, launched an annual vinyl competition named after "Needle In The Hay".

Cover versions 

The song was covered by numerous artists, including punk band Bad Astronaut for their 2001 album Acrophobe; drone metal duo Nadja on their 2009 covers album When I See the Sun Always Shines on T.V.; Mélissa Laveaux on her 2006 album Camphor & Copper; and Juliana Hatfield in 2014's I Saved Latin! A Tribute to Wes Anderson, a tribute album of songs used in the films of director Wes Anderson. It was also covered in a viral video of a parody of The Muppets character Kermit the Frog.

In July 2018, singer-songwriter Vanessa Carlton digitally released her own recording of "Needle in the Hay"; Carlton selected the track among a variety of songs that were unveiled as part of her 'Six Covers / Six Months' showcase. In reference to Smith's work, Carlton issued the following: "This is one of my favorite songs period. Elliott was a great poet and the metaphors in this lyric split me open. This song is a juxtaposition because the song is about excruciating pain and the brutal moments of an addiction spiral and yet it's formed in this drone-y meditative manner. Such restraint makes the listener have to move in closer. And then it breaks you. I hope I did him justice. He deserves the best."

Track listing 

 "Needle in the Hay" – 4:17
 "Alphabet Town" – 4:12
 "Some Song (Extended Intro)" – 2:21

References 

Elliott Smith songs
1995 singles
1995 songs
Songs about suicide
Songs written by Elliott Smith
Songs about heroin